Dmitry Dmitriyevich Minayev (2 November 1835, — 22 July 1889) was a Russian poet, parodist, journalist, translator and literary critic.

Biography 
Minayev was born in Simbirsk to the poet Dmitry Ivanovich Minayev, best known for his translation of The Tale of Igor's Campaign. After studying in 1847-1851 at the Konstantin's Artillery military college and three years of working as a clerk at the Simbirsk treasury he moved to Saint Petersburg and joined the Russian Foreign Ministry. After retirement in 1857 Minayev became the professional literary man and started  contributing to numerous magazines, including Sovremennik and Russkoye Slovo. Among the works of the foreign authors he translated were those by Lord Byron and Dante Alighieri.

After Dmitry Karakozov's attempt at the Tsar Alexander II's life, Minayev was arrested, accused of working for "magazines noted for their dangerous Socialist inclinations, notably Sovremennik and Russkoye Slovo" and spent four months in the Petropavlovskaya Fortress. In 1887 Minayev returned to his native Simbirsk. Two years later, on July 22, he died after prolonged illness.

References 

1835 births
1889 deaths
Russian male poets
Russian satirists
People from Ulyanovsk
19th-century poets
19th-century male writers from the Russian Empire